Casus Luciferi is the second studio album by the black metal band Watain. It was released in 2003 on Drakkar Productions. It was also released on limited edition vinyl by Norma Evangelium Diaboli and, in 2004, on tape by the Romanian label Mirgilus Siculorum. The album was remastered and reissued in October 2008 with a bonus track, a live cover of the song "Watain" by Von that the band is named after.

Reception 

According to Eduardo Rivadavia, writing for AllMusic, "[t]he career of Sweden's Watain took a major step forward with the release of 2003's second album, Casus Luciferi, which crystallized the sound that would elevate the band -- in tandem with reliably devastating concert rituals -- to the top of the global black metal bone pile." He stated that, with this album, Watain "exchang[ed] the Norwegian influences of prior efforts with a no less devilish blueprint delineated years earlier by seminal Swedish forefathers like Dissection, Marduk, and Dark Funeral." Rivadavia concluded his review saying, "one would be foolish to overlook any track on Casus Luciferi, such is the consistent quality maintained throughout this grand musical grimoire, brimming with power, majesty, and glorious ruin in the name of black metal, and paying testament to Watain's well-deserved ascension following its unveiling."

Track listing

Personnel 
 E. (aka Erik Danielsson) – vocals, bass (Curses & Bass of Doom)
 P. (a.k.a. Pelle Forsberg) – guitars (Darkness)
 H. (a.k.a. H. Jonsson) – drums, percussion (Chains)

Production 
 Arranged by Watain
 Produced, recorded, engineered, mixed and mastered by Tore Stjerna

References 

Watain albums
2003 albums
Season of Mist albums